Snelling may refer to:

People
Sir Arthur Snelling (1914–1996), British civil servant and diplomat
Barbara Snelling (1928–2015), American politician
Charles Snelling (figure skater) (born 1937), Canadian Olympic figure skater
Charles Mercer Snelling (1862–1939), first Chancellor of the University System of Georgia and President of the University of Georgia
Chris Snelling (born 1981), American baseball player
Diane B. Snelling (born 1952), American politician
Jack Snelling (born 1972), Australian politician
Josiah Snelling (1782–1828), commander of Fort Snelling
Lilian Snelling (1879–1972), British botanical artist
O. F. (Oswald Frederick) Snelling, English writer
Richard A. Snelling (1927–1991), governor of Vermont
Roy Snelling (1934–2008), American entomologist
Will Snelling, Australian rules footballer
William Joseph Snelling (1804–1848), American writer
Walter O. Snelling, American chemist

Places
 Snelling, California
 Snelling, South Carolina
 Minnesota State Highway 51, known as Snelling Avenue for most of its length in Saint Paul, Minnesota

See also
 Fort Snelling (disambiguation)
 Snell (disambiguation)